Sugg is an English surname. Notable people with the surname include:

Frank Sugg (1862–1933), English footballer and cricketer
Joe Sugg (born 1991), English video blogger, brother of Zoella
LaRee Sugg (born 1971), retired professional golfer from America
Walter Sugg (1860–1933), English first-class cricketer
William Thomas Sugg (1833–1907), British gas lighting engineer
Zoe Sugg or Zoella (born 1990), English model, video blogger and author

See also
H. B. Sugg High School, K-12 educational institution in Farmville, NC, closed in 1999
Sugg Clinic, Moderne Art Deco building in Ada, Oklahoma
W. D. Sugg Middle School, middle school in West Bradenton, Florida
Suggs (surname)

English-language surnames